This is a list of notable shopping malls, retail parks, and department stores in Romania.

Bihor County 
 Lotus Center
 Lotus Park

Brăila County 
 European Retail Park Brăila

Bucharest 
 Unirea Shopping Center
 Bucuresti Mall
 Militari Shopping
 Veranda Mall
 Sun Plaza
 Cotroceni Park
 Baneasa Shopping City
 Park Lake Mall
 Promenada
 Mega Mall
 Drumul Taberelor
 Plaza Romania 
 Grand Arena
 Vitantis Shopping Center

Constanța County 
 City Park Mall
 Tomis Mall
 Vivo Constanța mall
 Tom Shopping Center

Cluj County 
 Iulius Mall Cluj-Napoca
 VIVO! Cluj-Napoca

Iași County 
 Iulius Mall Iași
 Palas Mall

Prahova County 

 AFI Ploiesti
 Ploiesti Shopping Mall
 Mercur Shopping Center

Timiș County 
 Iulius Mall Timișoara
 Shopping City Timișoara

References 

 
Romania
Shopping malls